Tôtes is a commune in the Seine-Maritime department in the Normandy region in north-western France.

Geography
Prior to the construction of the autoroute system, it was a strategically important crossroads.

Heraldry

Population

Places of interest
 The church, dating from the nineteenth century.
 The nineteenth century château.
 The Auberge du Cygne, an inn and staging post of the 15th century.

People

Guy de Maupassant and Gustave Flaubert, French writers, stayed regularly at the inn
Bernard Monnereau (born 1935), Olympic rower (born in Tôtes)

Twin towns
 Bleckede, Germany, since 1977.
 Monreal del Campo, Spain

See also
 The Auberge du Cygnes
Communes of the Seine-Maritime department

References

Communes of Seine-Maritime